Ava Marlene Barber (born June 28, 1954) is an American country music singer and performer. She is best remembered for her performances on The Lawrence Welk Show throughout much of the 1970s and early 1980s.

She is also known as a recording artist, her best-known hit being the song, "Bucket to the South", which peaked at No. 13 on the Hot Country Songs list in 1978. She has done many reunion specials on PBS for The Lawrence Welk Show over the past number of years.

Early life and rise to fame
Ava Marlene Barber was born on June 28, 1954, in Knoxville, Tennessee, and was named after her mother's favorite actress Ava Gardner and singer Marlene Dietrich. While growing up, Barber often played in her brother's band.

Barber began listening to country music when her father would turn on the radio to a country music station every morning. Soon, every Saturday night, Barber would go to the auditorium of WNOX Radio, where "The Tennessee Barndance" was performed.

She began singing professionally at age 10.

She started performing, and recorded records for some local labels. 
Her mother was an avid fan of a popular television show at the time, The Lawrence Welk Show, and suggested that her daughter write to Welk.

Barber wrote to Welk in 1973, and he responded, suggesting that if she was on the West Coast, she should be on the show. About this same time, she married singer and musician Roger Sullivan.

The Lawrence Welk Show and success as a country singer
Soon, Barber was hired as a regular on The Lawrence Welk Show, and found herself performing on his television series on the West Coast. At the same time, Barber was trying to get her country music career off the ground. Chart success didn't come initially, but she released her first charting single in 1977 with the song, "Waitin' At the End of Your Run", a truck-driving song. The song was only moderately successful, though, reaching only No. 70 on the country singles charts that year. Barber's 1978 release, "Bucket to the South", turned into a big country hit, peaking at No. 13 on the Hot Country Songs list in 1978 and reaching No. 12 in Canada. Being a country singer brought her instant fame and she soon appeared on many  television shows such as Nashville  Now and Crook & Chase. She also made two appearances on the Grand Ole Opry.

Barber's success on the country charts tapered off after the success of "Bucket to the South". She was off the country charts until 1981, when she made a comeback with the single "I Think I Could Love You Better Than She Did". When The Lawrence Welk Show ended in 1982, Barber and her husband Roger returned to Knoxville, where they purchased their own bus and formed their own band, Sweet Apple. They toured the United States and Canada singing and performing.

Career in the 1990s and life today
In 1990, Barber and Sullivan went into business with Dick Dale and leased a theater located in Pigeon Forge, Tennessee, which they operated until 1996. From 1997 to 2000, Barber worked at the Welk Theatre in Branson, Missouri. Since 2000, she has toured with former members of The Lawrence Welk Show and performed on her own. She does reunion specials for PBS with previous members of the show.

Discography

Albums

Singles

References

External links
Ava Barber on Lawrence Welk
 Ava Barber Official Website

1954 births
Living people
American women country singers
American country singer-songwriters
Musicians from Knoxville, Tennessee
Country musicians from Tennessee
Lawrence Welk
Singer-songwriters from Tennessee